Midas Run (UK title A Run on Gold) is a 1969 American comedy film directed by Alf Kjellin and starring Richard Crenna, Anne Heywood and, in one of his final big-screen roles, Fred Astaire. It was shot at the Tirrenia Studios in Tuscany. Location shooting took place in London, Venice, Milan and Rome.

Plot
Pedley, retiring from the British Secret Service, can't understand why he hasn't yet been knighted. He devises an elaborate heist of an airplane cargo, recruiting Mike Warden, a writer from America, although his real aim is to capture the elusive General Ferranti.

Warden travels to Italy to assume control of the scheme along with Pedley's accomplice Sylvia Giroux, with whom he soon falls in love. They are arrested, but Pedley comes to their rescue just in time.

Cast
 Richard Crenna as Mike Warden
 Anne Heywood as Sylvia Giroux
 Fred Astaire as John Pedley
 Ralph Richardson as Lord Henshaw
 Cesar Romero as Carlo Dodero
 Adolfo Celi as General Ferranti
 Maurice Denham as Charles Crittenden
 John Le Mesurier as Wells
 Jacques Sernas as Paul Giroux
 Karl-Otto Alberty as Mark Dietrich
 George Hartmann as Anton Pfeiffer
 Carolyn De Fonseca as Ingeborg Pfeiffer 
 Aldo Bufi Landi as Carabiniere
 Stanley Baugh as Pilot
 Fred Astaire Jr. as Co-Pilot
 Bruce Beeby as Gordon
 Robert Henderson as The Dean
 Roddy McDowall as Wister

Reception
The film earned rentals of $300,000 in North America and $200,000 in other countries. After all costs were deducted it recorded a loss of $1,515,000.

See also
 List of American films of 1969

References

External links

1969 films
1969 comedy films
American comedy films
American heist films
Films directed by Alf Kjellin
Cinerama Releasing Corporation films
Films shot at Tirrenia Studios
Films shot in London
Films set in London
Films set in Venice
1960s English-language films
1960s American films